Scutiger sikimmensis is a species of toad in the family Megophryidae. It is found in northeastern India (West Bengal, Sikkim, and Meghalaya), Nepal, Bhutan, and Tibet. Many common names have been coined for this species: Sikkim lazy toad, Sikimmese pelobatid toad, Sikkim high altitude toad, Sikkim spade foot frog, Blyth's short-limbed frog, and Sikkim snow toad. It is very common in the high altitudes of Sikkimese Himalaya.

Description
Males measure  and females  in snout–vent length. The dorsum is olive green, brown, or greyish-brown with numerous warts and variable patterning. The underparts are yellowish, uniform and smooth. The head is wider than long; the tympanum is hidden. The parotoid gland are present. The fingers have no webbing whereas the toes have rudimentary webbing.

Habitat and conservation
Scutiger sikimmensis is an alpine toad living near streams, oxbow lakes, seepages, and stream-fed marshes as well as the surrounding forest and grassland habitats. Breeding takes place in streams in May–June or June–August; males call from under the rocks at night.

The species is common in the Indian part of its range but rare in Tibet. Major threats are diversion of water from breeding streams for irrigation and water pollution from agrochemicals. However, it is not considered threatened overall.

References

Scutiger (toad)
Amphibians of Bhutan
Amphibians of China
Fauna of Tibet
Frogs of India
Amphibians of Nepal
Amphibians described in 1855
Taxa named by Edward Blyth